Peter Pulu (born 25 August 1975 in Arawa) is a retired athlete from Papua New Guinea who competed in sprinting events. He represented his country at the 1996 Summer Olympics, as well as two outdoor and four indoor World Championships. In addition, he won multiple medals on regional level.

Competition record

Personal bests
Outdoor
100 metres – 10.40 (Stuttgart 1995) NR
200 metres – 21.51 (Prince George 1994)
Indoor
60 metres – 6.79 (Barcelona 1995) NR

References

1975 births
Living people
People from the Autonomous Region of Bougainville
Papua New Guinean male sprinters
Athletes (track and field) at the 1994 Commonwealth Games
Athletes (track and field) at the 1996 Summer Olympics
Athletes (track and field) at the 1998 Commonwealth Games
Athletes (track and field) at the 2002 Commonwealth Games
Olympic athletes of Papua New Guinea
Commonwealth Games competitors for Papua New Guinea
World Athletics Championships athletes for Papua New Guinea